Golokhvastovo is the name of several rural localities in Russia:

Golokhvastovo, Novofyodorovskoye Settlement, Troitsky Administrative Okrug, Moscow, village in Novofyodorovskoye Settlement, Troitsky Administrative Okrug, Moscow
Golokhvastovo, Voronovskoye Settlement, Troitsky Administrative Okrug, Moscow, village in Voronovskoye Settlement, Troitsky Administrative Okrug, Moscow
Golokhvastovo, Oryol Oblast, village in Orlovsky District, Oryol Oblast
Golokhvastovo, Tula Oblast,  village in Tyoplo-Ogaryovsky District, Tula Oblast